Labeo forskalii is fish in genus Labeo from Northeast and East Africa. It is under heavy fishing pressure in Uganda.

References 

Labeo
Cyprinid fish of Africa
Fish of Ethiopia
Fish of Uganda
Fish described in 1835